Natalie Joy Johnson (born May 24, 1978) is an American actress.

Early life and education 
Johnson was born in Baltimore, Maryland. She attended Mount Hebron High School in Ellicott City, Maryland, and earned a Bachelor of Arts degree in theatre from Mary Washington College.

Career 
In 2006, Johnson made her solo cabaret debut at Joe's Pub in a concert directed by Ben Rimalower.

In 2008 she appeared in a national commercial for Bank of America.

Johnson originated the role of Enid Hoopes in Legally Blonde and in 2008 performed as Paulette in the national tour of Legally Blonde. Some of her Off Broadway roles include Sinéad in But I'm a Cheerleader and Nadia in bare: a pop opera. Johnson joined the Broadway production of Kinky Boots on December 23, 2013, in the role of Pat.

In 2010, she appeared in the film When in Rome.

References

External links
 Personal site
 
 

American film actresses
Living people
1978 births
University of Mary Washington alumni
American musical theatre actresses
Actresses from Baltimore
21st-century American actresses